Absattar Baghysbaiuly Derbisali (Äbsattar Bağysbaiūly Derbısälı; September 15, 1947 – July 15, 2021) was a Kazakh Grand Mufti. He served as mufti from June 24, 2000 to February 18, 2013.

In February 2013, Derbissali resigned to continue his activity in science and education.

On February 26, 2013 Derbissali was appointed Director of Suleimenov Oriental Studies Institute.

Derbissali was a member of the Academy of Science of Kazakhstan. He was a Doctor of Philology, a professor, an orientalist and a diplomat. He held a diplomatic rank of the first class adviser.

Derbissali was the author of 400 theoretical articles and practical developments in the Arab language and literature, ancient periods of Kazakh literature and culture, Kazakhstan's spiritual connections with the Muslim countries of Middle East, as well as the history of Islam, Quran and the sayings of Muhammad.

See also
Islam in Kazakhstan

References

External links

Pope John Paul the Second visits Kazakhstan

1947 births
2021 deaths
Islam in Kazakhstan
Kazakhstani imams
Kazakhstani Sunni Muslims
21st-century imams
Supreme Muftis of Kazakhstan
People from Turkistan Region